Online storage may refer to:

 Computer data storage on a medium or a device that is under the control of a processing unit, i.e. storage that is not offline storage
 Online file storage provided by a file hosting service
 Cloud storage, a model of networked enterprise storage

See also 
 Online and offline
 Nearline storage